Tragedy of the Street (German: Dirnentragödie) is a 1927 German silent drama film directed by Bruno Rahn and starring Asta Nielsen, Hilde Jennings and Oskar Homolka. It is also known by the alternative title Women Without Men.

Cast
Asta Nielsen as Auguste - old street walker  
Hilde Jennings as Clarissa - young street walker  
Oskar Homolka as Anton - pimp 
Werner Pittschau as Felix - student 
Hedwig Pauly-Winterstein as his mother  
Otto Kronburger as his father  
Hermann Picha as Kauzke - pianist  
Gerhard Dammann
Eva Speyer as prostitute

See also
Between Night and Dawn (1931)

References

External links

1927 drama films
German drama films
Films of the Weimar Republic
Films directed by Bruno Rahn
German silent feature films
German films based on plays
Films about prostitution in Germany
German black-and-white films
Silent drama films
1920s German films
1920s German-language films